Cape Murray is a mainly ice-covered coastal bluff at the north side of the mouth of Carlyon Glacier, overlooking the west side of the Ross Ice Shelf. Discovered by the Discovery expedition (1901–04) and named for George R.M. Murray, temporary director of the scientific staff of the expedition, who had accompanied the Discovery as far as Cape Town.

Headlands of the Ross Dependency
Hillary Coast